Colin Ryan (born 1996) is an Irish hurler who plays as a midfielder for club side Pallasgreen and at inter-county level with the Limerick senior hurling team.

Playing career

Club

Ryan joined the Pallasgreen club at a young age and played in all grades at juvenile and underage levels before joining the club's top adult team. On 15 November 2014, he was Pallasgreen's top scorer with five points when the club won the Limerick Intermediate Championship following an 0-11 to 0-08 defeat of Monaleen in the final.

Inter-county

Minor and under-21

Ryan first played for the Limerick minor hurling team at the age of seventeen. On 23 July 2013, he was in goal when Limerick won their first Munster Championship title in 29 years after a 1-20 to 4-08 defeat of Waterford in a replay of the final. 

Ryan was eligible for the minor grade again the following year and won a second successive Munster Championship medal as an outfield player after a 0-24 to 0-18 second successive defeat of Waterford in a replay of the final. On 7 September 2014, he was at right wing-back for Limerick's 2-17 to 0-19 defeat by Kilkenny in the All-Ireland final.

Ryan subsequently joined the Limerick under-21 hurling team and won a Munster Championship medal in his first season after a 0-22 to 0-19 win over Clare in the final. On 12 September 2015, Ryan was at right corner-forward when Limerick defeated Wexford by 0-26 to 1-07 in the All-Ireland final.

After surrendering their titles in 2016, Ryan won a second Munster Championship medal after a 0-16 to 1-11 defeat of Cork in the final the following year. On 9 September 2017, Ryan was at midfield in Limerick's 0-17 to 0-11 defeat of Kilkenny in the All-Ireland final. He was later named on the Bord Gáis Energy Team of the Year.

Senior

On 19 February 2017, Ryan made his senior debut at right wing-back in a 6-21 to 3-08 defeat of AKerry in the National Hurling League. He was an unused substitute during Limerick's subsequent championship campaign.

On 19 August 2018, Ryan was a member of the extended panel when Limerick won their first All-Ireland title in 45 years after a 3-16 to 2-18 defeat of Galway in the final.

On 31 March 2019, Ryan was named on the bench for Limerick's National League final meeting with Waterford at Croke Park. He collected a winners' medal as a non-playing substitute in the 1-24 to 0-19 victory. On 30 June 2019, Ryan won a Munster Championship medal as a non-playing substitute following Limerick's 2-26 to 2-14 defeat of Tipperary in the final.

Ryan won the 2021 M Donnelly All-Ireland Poc Fada Championship.

Career statistics

Honours

Pallasgreen
Limerick Intermediate Hurling Championship (1): 2014

Limerick
All-Ireland Senior Hurling Championship (1): 2018
Munster Senior Hurling Championship (1): 2019
National Hurling League (1): 2019
All-Ireland Under-21 Hurling Championship (2): 2015, 2017
Munster Under-21 Hurling Championship (2): 2015, 2017
Munster Minor Hurling Championship (2): 2013, 2014

References

1996 births
Living people
Limerick inter-county hurlers
Pallasgreen hurlers